The Hutchins Nunataks are a group of nunataks rising to about ,  north-northeast of Mount Leek, in the Hauberg Mountains of southern Palmer Land, Antarctica. They were mapped by the United States Geological Survey (USGS) from surveys and U.S. Navy aerial photographs, 1961–67. The nunataks were visited in December 1977 by a USGS geological party, led by P.D. Rowley, and named after Lieutenant Commander John R. Hutchins, U.S. Navy, the command pilot of an LC-130 aircraft in support of the party.

References

Nunataks of Palmer Land